Blair Williams may refer to:

Blair Williams, fictional character in the Terminator Salvation
Blair Williams, actor who was known for his roles as Porter on The Adventures of Chuck and Friends
Blair Williams (television personality) (born 1992), Australian television personality, who was known as the cast of Non-Summit
Blair Williams, American pornographic actress